Kattanam is a village located in Central Travancore, Alappuzha district in the Indian state of Kerala, in the southern part of the country, 2,200 km south of the capital New Delhi. Kattanam is about 7 Km east of Kayamkulam, 10 Km South of Mavelikkara and 22 Km West of Adoor. Kattanam is located about 15 metres above sea level. Kattanam Junction is the one of the main Junctions in the SH - 5 (Kayamkulam - Punalur Road). Kattanam celebrates a lot of Cultural, Religious and Non-Religious festivals and programmes every year.

Educational Institutions
Pope Pius XI Higher Secondary School is one of the main educational institution Situated in Kattanam. Other institutions are Mahatma English Medium School, St.Thomas Senior Secondary School, CMS High School, Model Public School.

Places of Worship
Many religious institutions are situated at Kattanam. The Vetticode Nagaraja Temple is situated just 3 Km away from the Kattanam Junction.

The Christian Church St. Stephen's Malankara Orthodox Syrian Church known as Kattanam Valiyapalli is situated at the heart of Kattanam.

( In Asia it was the biggest Rasa occurring perennial times. Rasa is being three days and per day almost 10+ KM covering from Kattanam area. (Rasa is a religious worship). This program is conducting by Kattanam Valiyapally.)

Other places of worship are, St. Stephen's Malankara Catholic Church, Bharanikkavu Devi Temple, Oorukkuzhi Devi Temple, St. Thomas Marthoma Church, Valiyaveedu Devi Temple, Sacred Heart Roman Latin Catholic Church, St. James CSI Church, Mannadikkutti Devi Temple.

See also 
 Kayamkulam
 Mavelikkara
 Vallikunnam
 Charummoodu
 Adoor
 Pallippad
 Padanilam
 Bharanikkavu

References

Villages in Alappuzha district